Cross Bayou is a  river in Texas and Louisiana.  It is a tributary of the Red River, part of the Mississippi River watershed.

It flows through  Cross Lake on the outskirts of Shreveport, and joins the Red River in downtown Shreveport.

The latter portion is known as Twelve Mile Bayou, locally spelled Twelvemile Bayou.

Crossings
Kansas City Southern Railroad Bridge, Cross Bayou is a historic railway bridge that is the next to last crossing before the Red River.

See also
List of rivers of Louisiana
List of rivers of Texas

References

USGS Hydrologic Unit Map - State of Texas (1974)

Rivers of Louisiana
Rivers of Texas
Tributaries of the Red River of the South
Rivers of Caddo Parish, Louisiana
Rivers of Harrison County, Texas